iBoxx is a financial services division of IHS Markit that designs, calculates and distributes fixed income indices. iBoxx is overseen by IHS Markit Benchmark Administration Limited (IMBA UK), which is regulated by the Financial Conduct Authority and is an authorized benchmark administrator under the UK Benchmarks Regulation (UK BMR). IMBA UK's benchmark administration activities have been conducted in compliance with the IOSCO Principles for Benchmarks (IOSCO Principles) since 2014.

The iBoxx bond market indices are transparent, rules-based fixed income indices that are primarily used by passive and active professional investors as well as investment banks. iBoxx offers broad benchmarks used to evaluate investment performance and to conduct research, as well as liquid indices used as an underlying for tradable products, such as ETFs and Total Return Swaps (TRS).

The iBoxx product portfolio is global and is supported by multi-source pricing and IHS Markit’s proprietary Evaluated Bond Pricing Service (‘EVB’) to improve pricing accuracy, minimise tracking error and safeguard the independence of the indices. iBoxx coverage spans over 20,000 bonds to date and includes corporate, sub-sovereign and sovereign bonds, as well as loans and securitised products.

There is over $150bn in estimated assets under management (AUM) tracking ETFs on iBoxx indices. Notable ETFs, amongst over 150 tracking iBoxx indices, include the iShares iBoxx $ Investment Grade Corporate Bond ETF ‘LQD’ and the iShares iBoxx $ High Yield Corporate Bond ETF ‘HYG’.

Products
iBoxx offers both standard and customised index solutions, with over 25,000 live indices running on their platform. The product portfolio is global in nature, covering the major currencies and market segments within the fixed income universe.

iBoxx’s standard indices consist of 35 core index families:

iBoxx’s research and design capabilities are bolstered by a breadth of IHS Markit and partner data, which provide unique index construction opportunities within the transparent, rules-based index framework.

History
The iBoxx bond index family, which launched in 2001, was the first comprehensive suite of independent, transparent and multiple-contributor priced bond indices. iBoxx was ) created by the International Index Company Limited (IIC), which was acquired by Markit Group Limited in 2007. Markit Group Limited merged with  IHS Inc. in 2016 to form IHS Markit Ltd. The IIC was established in 2001 and headquartered in Frankfurt, Germany. The company began as a joint venture between ABN AMRO, Barclays Capital, BNP Paribas, Deutsche Bank, Deutsche Boerse, Dresdner Kleinwort, Goldman Sachs, HSBC, JPMorgan, Morgan Stanley and UBS, prior to being acquired by Markit in 2007.

iBoxx indices were a market innovation, allowing the 10 co-operating banks and Deutsche Boerse to reference a singular, standard benchmark. This model was an improvement over the single-institution index model, introducing a ‘give-get’ model which incentivised data contributions, and by virtue, improved the reliability and accuracy of the index and underlying constituents’ pricing data, through the multi-source pricing inputs. The iBoxx franchise continues to operate under a ‘give-get’ model, referencing multiple sources for its data inputs.

In 2003, iBoxx launched the iBoxx CDS indices, which would later be merged with the Trac-x indices created by J.P. Morgan & Co. and Morgan Stanley to form the iTraxx product suite.

Governance and External Committees
In compliance with BMR and the IOSCO Principles, IMBA UK is responsible for the administration and calculation of benchmark families and therefore is the Administrator of each Index and, where applicable, associated Benchmarks within these families.

To ensure ongoing dialogue with and feedback from Index users, the Administrator has established External Advisory Committees (EAC). For some index families, such EACs consist of a Technical Advisory Committee (TAC) and a General Advisory Committee (GAC), with representation from sellside institutions and the buyside respectively.

EACs operate to aid the development and operation of the relevant Indices by providing insight and feedback for the development of new Indices, improvements for existing Indices, or the cessation of Indices. They review and provide input on potential and proposed changes to the Index methodologies and constituents as well as on regulatory, legal and compliance issues and general risks. They also advise on technical matters in respect of the operation of the Indices and address any relevant request from the Administrator in a timely manner.

These committees also provide input into the Annual Index Review (AIR) organised by the Administrator. The Administrator considers feedback from these as part of the formal consultation process with all market participants.

Committee members represent senior practitioners in their field who are appointed by the Administrator based on market expertise and ability to contribute to discussions from experience and use of the relevant indices.

Notable Launches in Recent Years

See also
 iTraxx

Sources

External links
 Homepage
 Documentation
 News and Information
 Governance and Regulatory Compliance Overview

Bond market indices